Raphael Eugene "Ray" Kuka (February 17, 1922 – March 27, 1990) was an American professional basketball player. He played in the Basketball Association of America for the New York Knicks during the 1947–48 season and part of the 1948–49 season. Kuka also served briefly as the Knicks' interim head coach for a few games in February 1949. Joe Lapchick, the regular head coach, was hospitalized to treat a stomach disorder. Kuka had also previously served as a team scout.

Kuka played in college for Notre Dame before being drafted into the United States Air Force for World War II. After World War II he returned home and played for Montana State, where he earned all-conference honors.

Following his playing career, Kuka returned to hos hometown of Havre, Montana, where he was a successful high school coach and teacher.

BAA career statistics

Regular season

Playoffs

References

External links

1922 births
1990 deaths
American basketball scouts
American men's basketball players
United States Army Air Forces personnel of World War II
Basketball coaches from Montana
Basketball players from Montana
Forwards (basketball)
High school basketball coaches in Montana
Montana State Bobcats men's basketball players
New York Knicks head coaches
New York Knicks players
New York Knicks scouts
Notre Dame Fighting Irish football players
Notre Dame Fighting Irish men's basketball players
People from Havre, Montana
Undrafted National Basketball Association players